Monochroa cleodora is a moth of the family Gelechiidae. It was described by Edward Meyrick in 1935. It is found in Japan (Honshu, Shikoku, Kyushu) and Korea.

References

Moths described in 1935
Monochroa